Lengby (pronounced lang - bee) is a city in Polk County, Minnesota, United States. It is part of the Grand Forks ND-MN Metropolitan Statistical Area. The population was 92 at the 2020 census.

History
A post office called Lengby has been in operation since 1898. Lengby had a depot on the railroad. In 1980, Jean Hilliard survived being frozen for six hours in sub zero temperatures.

Geography

Demographics

2010 census
As of the census of 2010, there were 86 people, 44 households, and 24 families living in the city. The racial makeup of the city was 95.3% White, 2.3% Native American, and 2.3% from other races. Hispanic or Latino of any race were 5.8% of the population.

There were 44 households, of which 20.5% had children under the age of 18 living with them, 43.2% were married couples living together, 9.1% had a female householder with no husband present, 2.3% had a male householder with no wife present, and 45.5% were non-families. 43.2% of all households were made up of individuals, and 18.2% had someone living alone who was 65 years of age or older. The average household size was 1.95 and the average family size was 2.50.

The median age in the city was 47.5 years. 16.3% of residents were under the age of 18; 7% were between the ages of 18 and 24; 21% were from 25 to 44; 35% were from 45 to 64; and 20.9% were 65 years of age or older. The gender makeup of the city was 48.8% male and 51.2% female.

2000 census
As of the census of 2000, there were 79 people, 42 households, and 21 families living in the city. The racial makeup of the city was 98.73% White and 1.27% Native American.

There were 42 households, out of which 23.8% had children under the age of 18 living with them, 40.5% were married couples living together, 7.1% had a female householder with no husband present, and 50.0% were non-families. 45.2% of all households were made up of individuals, and 33.3% had someone living alone who was 65 years of age or older. The average household size was 1.88 and the average family size was 2.57.

In the city, the population was spread out, with 16.5% under the age of 18, 3.8% from 18 to 24, 20.3% from 25 to 44, 31.6% from 45 to 64, and 27.8% who were 65 years of age or older. The median age was 50 years. For every 100 females, there were 125.7 males. For every 100 females age 18 and over, there were 120.0 males.

The median income for a household in the city was $24,583, and the median income for a family was $35,000. Males had a median income of $31,250 versus $24,375 for females. The per capita income for the city was $15,864. There were 7.7% of families and 9.1% of the population living below the poverty line, including no under eighteens and 31.6% of those over 64.

References

Cities in Minnesota
Cities in Polk County, Minnesota